Operation Blue Orchid was a joint United States-Russian operation to dismantle an online child pornography ring, centering on the website Blue Orchid. It began in May 2000, after an informant in a separate child pornography case came forward with information about the Blue Orchid site. The website, which showed depictions of rape, contained videos of Russian boys aged eight being abused, selling such videos for around $300 each. The investigation included US Customs Officials allegedly buying one of the videos from the website. The operation lead to the arrest of four Americans and five Russians, including Vsevolod Solntsev-Elbe, creator and business manager of the Blue Orchid website. It was seen as a success – particularly for international cooperation – and led Charles Winwood, acting commissioner in US Customs, to say "Operation Blue Orchid demonstrates that there really are no borders when it comes to our mutual interest in protecting children".

References

Child pornography crackdowns
2000 in the United States
2000 in Russia
Online child abuse
Underground culture